Siddhikali Temple is a Hindu temple located in Thimi, Nepal. The two storeys roofed temple is dedicated to Lord Kali, Shiva and Ganesh. It is also believed that this Shaktipeeth is formed due to the falling of right eye of the corpse of Sati. This place is located in Inayekwo, in the north west of Thimi. The temple is also known as Inayekwo Dyo in Nepal Bhasa language. And Siddhikali Temple is also known as Chamunda, one of the goddess of Astamatrika. The majestically impressive Siddhikali temple has numbers of Pataa streaming down the front. There's a Satah (rest-house) opposite to temple and multiple Falcha (Inns) and several smaller shrines (Bhairav, Shiva Temple, Saraswoti Temple, Bhimsen Temple, Basundhara Temple, Sahsrabhuj Lokeshwor Temple, Buddha Chaitya) to the rear and nearby and several stone taps around the place. The artwork around the Siddhikali temple is fantastic and worth a close inspection.

Siddhikali Temple or Siddhi Kali Temple is a cultural and religious place. Inside the temple goddess Siddhikali and Lord Ganesh in the middle part can be easily recognized. Beside that Bhairav and Navadurga deities are also exists inside the temple. In Chapacho Thimi, there is Siddhikali Dyo Chhen located which means House of God where we can worship goddess Siddhikali here too. The Jatra of goddess Siddhikali starts from here and ends to here. Twice in a year (Baisakh 1 and Yenya Punhi) goddess siddhikali takes to Siddhikali temple from Dyo chhen to observe the Jatra known as Dyo Bwekegu Jatra. The curious and mystries of goddess siddhikali is that statue of Lord Ganesh is kept as goddess Siddhikali on Dyo Chhen and same idol is kept on the chariot during Biska Jatra (Bisket Jatra) (Baisakh 1st and 2nd) and Yenya Punhi Siddhikali Jatra.

Siddhikali temple is a Shaktipeeth and holy pilgrimage place situated on the outskirts of old city Thimi of Bhaktapur District. There is two traditional gate (Dhwakha) to enter the city from Siddhikali temple. On the past days a residential area only start from the gate. One Dhwakha was near to Nasanani Tole which was totally vanished and another is near to Dwoda Tole which are the nearest residential area from temple. Beside that there is two newly built entrance gate near to temple.

Siddhikali temple premises have more than 10 traditional Lhon hiti (stone taps) and two ponds. Still most of the stone tap is flowing natural water continuously. Most of Lhon hiti have their own name like Dhwo hiti, Poo hiti, Nasa hiti, Dathu hiti, Patawal hiti.

It is believed that goddess Siddhikali fulfill the wishes of devotees. Everyday lots of devotees visit the temple. Tuesday and Saturday is the special day to worship goddess Siddhikali. Most of tuesday and saturday night, people came here to worship and light the diyo of Itaa (a type of diyo made by cotton and oil) around the temple which is called as Chaakamataa Chyakeu in Newa language. Devotees light the diyo with oil around the temple.

The Nitya Bhajan is performed everyday in the morning and every saturday night and also Ramayan Bhajan performed every friday mid-day in Siddhikali Temple. 

There is numbers of Pataa (a long metal hanging from top of temple to front) in siddhikali temple. Most of the Pataa are offered from devotees which shows the deep belief to the Goddess siddhikali.

The Khuchaa (small river) is passed through the temple premises. A Bhimsen Temple is located on the bank of that Khucha, a west side of Siddhikali temple. That was a pilgrimage site known as Bishnuganga, also called Bhimghat. On the past days, often crying babies (sobbing) are bring here to wash their face. It is believed that the babies will stop often crying problem after washing the face from that river. People from north part of Thimi still came here to offer and flow Pinda to their ancestors after completing Shradhha (a special worship of ancestors, mostly done annually on death date ).

A Mahadev temple is located near to Bhimsen Temple, which is known as Gopaleshwor Mahadev.

On the east part of Siddhikali temple, there is a small hill known as Kutunga: hill. It is believed that while carrying the Sanjivani hill by Lord Hanuman, some part of Sanjivani hill was fell down here. Kutunga: means fallen hill in Newa language.

On the day of Gathemangal- Gathamuga chaturdashi,  3 different Gathamuga is pulled out to bank of the Khucha near to Siddhikali temple and burn it there. Every year 3 Gathamuga from Nasanani Tole, Digu tole and Wachunani-Kumanani Tole of Thimi are pulled to here. Gathamuga chaturdashi is a unique festival where festivals of Newa people starts.

During Dashain festival, on the day of Fulpati, the Fulpati (an assortment of different plants and flowers) is brought from Siddhikali temple to Layeku Taleju temple of Thimi and Khadga Jatra (Khaan Pyaa Woigu) is celebrated on the next day of Bijaya Dashami in Balkumari temple premises.

Siddhikali Jatra is celebrate twice in a year. Once in Baisakh month known as Biska Jatra and another in Bhadra month known as Yenya Punhi Jatra. On the day of Yenya punhi night, goddess Siddhikali is taken to temple from Dyo Chhen (God house) which is called Dyo Bwekegu Jatra. A special worship is done in temple then returned back to Dyo chhen again. During Dyo Bwekegu Jatra, only Dyo Bwekegu beats is played in Dhime Baja (drum type musical instrument). On the next day, pratipada tithi night Siddhikali jatra is celebrated within Siddhikali Jatra route (traditional route of siddhikali jatra) by carrying the Palanquin, playing Dhime, Bhusya and carrying Chilakh (special type oil lamp). Siddhikali jatra is started from Dyo Chhen and makes rounds in Thimi core area and ends at Dyo Chhen again.

On Biska Jatra (Bisket Jatra), 1st of Baisakh morning, Dyo Bwekegu jatra is performed by taking the goddess Siddhikali from Dyo Chhen to temple. Baisakh 1st is the big day for Thimi locality. On this day A puja is offered whole day. Most of people from Thimi visit the temple to worship. On evening of the day a big jatra of Siddhikali Gan is celebrated in temple premises. Seven palanquins of Siddhikali Gan (Siddhikali, Koshi Inaye Ganesh, Bishwo Binayak, Korki Inaye Ganesh, Gaancha Inaye Ganesh, Raj Ganesh and Shiwa Ganesh) are gathered together and celebrate a big Biska Jatra in Siddhikali temple premises, it is also known as Siddhikali Jatra and Byalisiya Jatra. The crowds, sounds of Dhime and Bhusyas, Naya khin, vermilion color, fires on Chilakh, seven palanquins and rounding Chhatra are the best moments of the jatra. The Jatra will take round the Thimi upper part too.
On Baisakh 2nd morning 19 palanquins are gathered together with Siddhikali Gan in Balkumari temple premises to celebrate Suthasiya Biska Jatra/Balkumari Jatra and makes round of Thimi city.

In Baisakh 1st Biska Jatra 7 palanquins are gathered together in temple premises. But one palanquin (Bishwo Binayak) will not cross the Dhwakha (traditional gate to enter the city) of temple premises and stops near the Dhwakha and other all palanquins will take to temple and round the Siddhikali temple. On the left side of Siddhikali temple there is a Lhon hiti (stone tap) which still has a supernatural power. It is believed that, the stone tap has Gholi Naag and the Aasan (throne) of Bishwo Binayak has also Gholi Naag. Both Gholi Naag should not meet each other so the palanquin of Bishwo Binayak stops near to Dhwakha and will not cross that Dhwakha.

There are numbers of Guthi related to Siddhikali Jatra from ancient period. Each Guthi has their own responsibility during the jatra period. Siddhikali Dyo Guthi, Siddhikali Moo Dhime Guthi, Siddhikali Dhime Guthi, Chhatra Guthi, Nol Guthi, Sinha Guthi, Falcha Guthi, Dalbu Guthi, Siddhikali Basuri Khala are the some guthis related to Siddhikali Jatra.

Moo Dhime is a special Dhime in whole Thimi city. It is played with one Dhime only where other Dhime are played in groups with numbers of Dhime. A single Dhime with more Bhusya, Chwamo (Chamar) and Pankha in Biska jatra is the one of main attraction of Biska Jatra (Bisket Jatra). This Dhime is played outside only two days (Baisakh 1 and 2nd) in a year. Rest of days it is kept on hanging in Moo Dhime Chhen. Only after the arrival of Moo Dhime in jatra, the palanquin of Siddhikali is carried out. So that it has a major role during Biska jatra. This Dhime is called the symbol of Naag. The beats of this Dhime is totallay different and unique from other common Dhime beats. The Moo Dhime beats are not allowed to play by other common Dhime in jatras and in any occasions. Moo Dhime Guthi is formed to protect and play the Dhime in Biska Jatra.

The major festivals celebrated in Siddhikali Temple premises are Biska Jatra / Bisket Jatra ( Last days of Chaitra month, Baisakh 1st and Baisakh 2nd), Digu puja, Gathemangal, Yenya punhi Jatra, Mohani (Dashain), Bala Chaturdashi, Shree Panchami/Vasant Panchami, Bhim Dwadashi, Holi Purnima and Maha Shivaratri.

See also
List of Hindu temples in Nepal

External links

References

Hindu temples in Bagmati Province
Buildings and structures in Bhaktapur District